The Chinese American Museum of Chicago (CAMOC) seeks to advance the appreciation of Chinese American culture through exhibitions, education, and research and to preserve the past, present, and future of Chinese Americans primarily in the American Midwest.  The museum opened in 2005 in Chicago's Chinatown neighborhood.  Although it suffered a damaging fire in 2008, it reopened its renovated quarters, the Raymond B. & Jean T. Lee Center, in 2010. CAMOC is governed by the Board of Directors of the Chinatown Museum Foundation (CMF), a 501(C)(3) non-profit corporation located in Chicago, Illinois.

History
The museum building was built in 1896 as a warehouse, and was later home to the Quong Yick Co. After a devastating fire in September 2008, the museum was closed. Raymond B. Lee, whose family ran a food wholesale business in the museum building, donated $660,000 to buy the building to start the museum. Lee, who as a teen slept on the third floor, has donated another $250,000 for renovations since the fire. It reopened its renovated quarters, the Raymond B. & Jean T. Lee Center, in 2010.

Current Exhibits

 The permanent exhibit, "Great Wall to Great Lakes: Chinese Immigration to the Midwest " on the second floor tells the stories of immigrant journeys to the Chicago area and beyond; when, how and why the Chinese who came to America made their way across the country to settle in the Midwest.
 Another permanent exhibit, "My Chinatown: Stories from Within", a 16-minute video on the second floor, about the stories of the people of Chinatown- their journeys, their customs, their work, their families- from within Chinatown borders. The video was a collaboration between Chinese American Museum of Chicago and the Chicago History Museum. 
The temporary exhibit "Attic Treasures II", on the first floor, shines the light on a number of objects not previously publicly displayed in the museum. The objects range from historic furniture, photographs and paintings to treasured jewelry, teapots, and other items lovingly saved over the generations. During closures due to the COVID-19 pandemic, the museum continues to offer a virtual tour of the exhibit.

Past Exhibits 

The temporary exhibit "The Way We Wore: Celebrating Chinese Fashion Heritage" displayed Chinese fashion heritage with donations and loans from the Chinese community. Many of the objects in the museum came from donations or loans from community members and people in the surrounding areas, and that shows in what is displayed, from family photos to personal jewelry sets. The exhibition closed February 10, 2019 to make way for the Railroad exhibition.
Another temporary exhibit, "The Chinese Helped Build the Railroad–The Railroad Helped Build America"] focused on the important role Chinese immigrants had when constructing America's first Transcontinental Railway in the 1800s. The bilingual exhibit, which features photographs by Li Ju, pays tribute the approximately 12,000 Chinese workers who completed the railway and also includes recreations of their day-to-day life. The project was organized through contributions by the Chinese Railroad Workers in North America Project at Stanford University, Li Ju, and the Chinese Historical Society of America. The exhibition opened on March 2, 2019.

Events

Chinese New Year Celebration 
Each year a Chinese New Year Celebration is held at the museum, featuring live Chinese traditional music, lion dancing, Chinese chess, calligraphy design and delicious food. The 2021 Chinese New Year Celebration went virtual due to the COVID-19 pandemic.

Film screenings 

 WUHAN WUHAN: Observational documentary going beyond salacious headlines to focus on the human experience at the height of the COVID-19 pandemic in Wuhan city.
 A Tale of Three Chinatowns: A Tale of Three Chinatowns looks at the forces altering each community and the challenges that go with them. This feature-length documentary presents the current pressing topic of urban development and gentrification through the eyes of those on the frontlines.
Celestials: Documentary exploring the lives of Chinese workers who built the transcontinental railroad
First Vote: Documentary spotlighting politically-engaged Chinese Americans and examining the diverse Asian American electorate.
Soul of a Banquet: The life of Cecilia Chang, the woman who introduced America to authentic Chinese food.
Wu Xia 2: The Code: Martial arts science fiction film; sequel to Wu Xia: A Martial Arts Tango.
Finding Cleveland: Documentary tracing a Chinese American family's roots in the segregated South.
Office (華麗上班族): Movie musical spectacular revolving around corporate maneuvering and romantic intrigue.
Making Ties: The CangDong Village Project: Collaborative research program studying the home villages of Chinese migrants.
The Search for General Tso: Documentary uncovering the origins of the ubiquitous dish, General Tso's chicken.
Reunification: Reflections on a family's migration from Hong Kong to Los Angeles in the early 1980s. A family history fraught with betrayal, divorce, economic strife, and miscommunication.
Canton Army in the High Sierras: Documentary about the Chinese workers who built America's first transcontinental railroad.
My Odyssey - Between Two Worlds: One man's journey to his ancestral village to uncover his family's roots.
Abacus: Small Enough to Jail: Documentary about the Sung family's (Abacus Federal Savings) legal battle during the 2008 financial crisis.
Made in Vietnam: A Vietnamese American searches for his father in his family's homeland.
Maineland: Coming-of-age tale of "parachute students" in blue-collar, rural Maine.
A Village Doctor's Choice: A Shanghai Medical College student faces challenges when he is sent to the Tibetan prairie to work as their one and only doctor "Manba" in the late 60s.
 Dancing Through Life: The Dorothy Toy Story: 100-year-old Dorothy Toy Fong is a living dance legend. During the 1930s, '40s and '50s she teamed up with Paul Wing to become the most famous Asian American dance duo in this country's history. Toy and Wing were pioneers, performing on Broadway and in Hollywood films.
 Finding Samuel Lowe: From Harlem to China: Three successful black siblings from Harlem discover their heritage by searching for clues about their long-lost Chinese grandfather, Samuel Lowe.
 Journey of a Paper Son: A paper son (one who illegally immigrated to the U.S., using fake documents and claiming he's the son of an American citizen) and asks them for a final wish to change back his name.

See also

 Chinese in Chicago
 Weaverville Joss House State Historic Park
 Chinese American Museum
 Museum of Chinese in America
 Chinese Historical Society of Southern California
 Chinese Culture Center

External links 

Official Website of Chinese American Museum of Chicago

References

Asian-American culture in Chicago
Chinese-American culture in Illinois
Chinese-American museums
Ethnic museums in Illinois
Museums in Chicago
Museums established in 2005
2005 establishments in Illinois
Cultural centers in Chicago
Armour Square, Chicago